Ghebremariam (gebiremarīyami) or Gebremariam (gebiremarīyami) is a common surname in Eritrea and Ethiopia with the meaning "slave/servant of Mary".
It can refer to the following people:

Ghebremariam 
 Ghirmai Ghebremariam, Eritrean diplomat
 Woldemichael Ghebremariam, Eritrean politician

Gebremariam 
 Gebregziabher Gebremariam (born 1984), retired Ethiopian long-distance runner
 Haile Tilahun Gebremariam (born 1954), Ethiopian officer

Surnames
Tigrinya-language names
Amharic-language names